The Bay of Palma is a bay located to the south of Palma, Majorca, Spain. It is in the south-west of the Balearic Island of Mallorca. Palma de Majorca's harbour is located on the northern shores along with some famous beaches. It is bounded to the west by Cape Cala Figuera, to the north by the city of Palma, to the south by the Mediterranean Sea and to the east by the White Cape. The Serra de Na Burguesa terminates at its shore.

Notable residents

 Steve McManaman, English football player who played for Liverpool F.C., Real Madrid F.C. and Manchester City F.C..

References

Bays of Spain
Bays of the Mediterranean
Landforms of Mallorca